James Benjamin Batley (1876–1964) was an English professional golfer. His main successes came in foursomes events, winning the 1909 London Professional Foursomes Tournament and the 1914 Sphere and Tatler Foursomes Tournament. He played for England in the 1912 England–Scotland Professional Match.

Golf career

In 1909 Batley won the London Professional Foursomes Tournament, playing with William Horne. The 36-hole final against James Bradbeer and George Charles was played at Walton Heath Golf Club on 26 May and resulted in a convincing win for Batley and Horne by a score of 11&10.

He was runner-up in the 1913 Tooting Bec Cup. He had finished joint leader in the southern section qualifying competition for the Sphere and Tatler Foursomes Tournament with Harry Vardon, played at Fulwell Golf Club. Rowland Jones and Ted Ray had similarly been joint leaders at Denham Golf Club, where the remaining half of the section played. A playoff between the four players would determine the winner of the Tooting Bec Cup. The playoff did not take place for nearly a year, being played on 14 April 1914 at Thorpe Hall Golf Club. 18 holes were played and resulted in another tie. Batley and Ray scoring 74, with Jones on 77 and Vardon on 78. There was then a further playoff on 20 April 1914 at Old Fold Manor Golf Club. Again 18 holes were played, Ray winning with a score of 74 to Batley's 76.

In 1914 he won the Sphere and Tatler Foursomes Tournament in partnership with Len Holland, beating the Scottish pair of C McIntosh and George Smith 5&4 in the final.

Batley was Chairman of the PGA in 1928–29 and was a selector for the 1929 Ryder Cup team.

Professional wins
1909 London Professional Foursomes Tournament (with William Horne)
1914 Sphere and Tatler Foursomes Tournament (with Len Holland)

Results in major championships

Note: Batley only played in The Open Championship.

WD = withdrew
? = finish unknown
CUT = missed the half-way cut
"T" indicates a tie for a place

Team appearances
England–Scotland Professional Match (representing England): 1912 (tie)

References

English male golfers
People from Bethnal Green
1876 births
1964 deaths